The Order of Service Merit (Hangul: 근정훈장) is one of South Korea's orders of merit. It is awarded by the President of South Korea to public officials, private school teachers, and special post office employees for "outstanding meritorious services by applying himself/herself to his/her duties."

Grades
The Order of Service Merit is divided into five grades.

Notable recipients

 Ban Ki-moon
 Cristian Barros
 Wallace M. Greene
 Thanat Khoman
 Kim Duck-soo
 Victor H. Krulak
 Yeon Cheon Oh

See also 
 Orders, decorations, and medals of South Korea

References

External links
Images of the Order of Service Merit (in Korean with some English)

Orders, decorations, and medals of South Korea